Free skate may refer to:

 Inline skates
 Free skating